Migishi Kōtarō (Japanese:三岸 好太郎; 18 April 1903, Sapporo - 1 July 1934, Nagoya) was a Japanese painter in the yōga style.

Life and work 
When he completed his primary studies in 1920, he went to Tokyo, where he saw paintings by Cézanne and Van Gogh at an exhibition sponsored by the Shirakaba-ha, a prominent literary association. 

In 1921, he was able to show some paintings at the third "Central Art Exhibition" (中央美術展). The following year, he exhibited there again and was awarded First Prize. Soon after he, Yokobori Kakujirō (1897–1978), a friend from the Shun’yō-kai, and others put together their own exhibition. 

Later that year, he married the painter, Yoshida Setsuko. In 1928 he, his wife and a friend, organized their own exhibition. He would exhibit with them annually for the remainder of his life.

After 1932, he was increasingly influenced by modern French art; showing some of his works at an avant-garde exhibition in Paris, as well as at the Progressive Art Alliance in Tokyo. He combined ideas from Abstract Expressionism with Fauvism, then switched to Surrealism. In 1934 he published, at his own expense, a long narrative poem called "Butterflies and Shells" (蝶と貝殻), with illustrations.

That same year, while travelling in Nagoya, he died unexpectedly, from a bleeding stomach ulcer. His home prefecture dedicated his estate to establishing a museum in Sapporo, called the ".

Selected paintings

Sources 
 Japan Foundation: "Migishi". In:  (exhibition catalog),  Museum für Ostasiatische Kunst, Cologne, 1985
 Tazawa, Yutaka: "Migishi Kōtarō". In: Biographical Dictionary of Japanese Art. Kodansha International, 1981. .

External links 

 Migishi Kotaro Museum of Art, Hokkaido @ Welcome Sapporo
 More works by Migishi @ ArtNet

1903 births
1934 deaths
Japanese painters
Yōga painters
People from Hokkaido
Deaths from ulcers
Artists from Hokkaido